The Kreutzer Quartet is a British string quartet.

With their selected programs they have given concerts in Italy, Germany, France, Holland, Serbia, Montenegro, Sardinia, the United States, Spain, Cyprus, Poland and Lithuania.

A further focus is the critical examination of not only recordings of classical works, but above all of contemporary string quartets by Robert Gerhard, Michael Finnissy, Harrison Birtwistle, Gloria Coates, Michael Tippett and Hafliði Hallgrímsson. There exist recordings on the labels Metier, Naxos, NMC Recordings, Chandos, Guild and New Focus.

Members 
 Peter Sheppard Skærved (violin)
 Mihailo Trandafilovski and Gordon MacKay (violin) before
 Clifton Harrison and zuvor Morgan Goff (alto)
 Neil Heyde (Violoncello)

Recordings 
 Kreutzer Quartet (2002) – Gloria Coates: Streichquartett Nr. 1, 5, 6 (Naxos 8.559091)
 Kreutzer Quartet (2003) – Gloria Coates: Streichquartett Nr. 2, 3, 4, 7 and 8 (Naxos 8.559152)
 Kreutzer Quartet (2010) – Gloria Coates: Streichquartett Nr. 9, "Solo Violin Sonata", "Lyric Suite" for Klaviertrio (Naxos 8.559666)
 Kreutzer Quartet – Gloria Coates – Streichquartette Nr. 1–9 (3-CD-Box-Set) (Naxos 8.503240)
 Kreutzer Quartet (2008) – Thomas Simaku: Streichquartett Nr. 2 and 3, Soliloquy I–III (Naxos 8.570428)
 Tapestry – Chamber music by Elliott Schwartz (Metier msv 28537)
 Grieg and Finnissy – piano quintets (first recording); Roderick Chadwick (piano); Kreutzer Quartett (Metier msv 28541)
 Michael Finnissy – Second and third string quartets (NMC Recordings D180)

References

External links 
 

British string quartets